The 2010 (21st annual) World Music Awards took place in Monte Carlo, Monaco and it was hosted by Michelle Rodriguez and Hayden Panettiere on May 18, 2010. This award ceremony returned after a one-year break, in the same spiritual home of Monte Carlo.

Performers
In order of appearance, shown on television.
Jennifer Lopez – Hits medley ("Louboutins", Get Right", "Jenny from the Block", "Love Don't Cost a Thing", "If You Had My Love", "Waiting for Tonight", "Let's Get Loud")
Deborah Cox – "Leave the World Behind"
N.E.R.D. – "Beautiful", "Hot 'n' Fun"
Namie Amuro – "Hide and Seek"
David Guetta featuring Kelly Rowland – "When Love Takes Over"
David Guetta featuring will.i.am – "I Wanna Go Crazy"
David Guetta featuring Akon – "Sexy Chick"
Ludacris – "How Low"
Andrea Bocelli – "Un Amore Cosi Grande"
Scorpions – "The Best Is Yet To Come" / "Rock You Like a Hurricane" / "Wind of Change (song)" medley
Elissa – "Tesada'a Bemeen"

Appearance not broadcast on television:
Tiziano Ferro – "Breathe Gentle"

Nominees & winners
Below is a list of the nominees for each award, in order of presentation, as shown on television. Winners are in bold.

Best New Artist
Presented by will.i.am
Justin Bieber
Lady Gaga
Susan Boyle
Ke$ha

Best Hip-Hop Act
Presented by Karolína Kurková
Eminem
The Black Eyed Peas
Jay-Z
Ludacris

Best Producer
Presented by Kelly Rowland
will.i.am
Akon
Pharrell Williams
David Guetta

Best African Artist
Presented by Tommy Hilfiger
Akon

Best Asian Artist
Presented by Paris Hilton
 Namie Amuro

World's Best Pop/Rock Artist
Presented by Karolína Kurková
Lady Gaga
Madonna
Rihanna
Taylor Swift

Outstanding Contribution to the Arts
Presented by Cuba Gooding Jr.
Jennifer Lopez

Best DJ
Presented by Victoria Silvstedt
Tiësto
David Guetta
Armin van Buuren
deadmau5

Best French Artist
David Guetta

Best R&B Artist
Presented by Paris and Nicky Hilton
Alicia Keys
Akon
The Black Eyed Peas
Beyoncé

Best Single
Presented by Melody Thornton
Sexy Chick by David Guetta feat. Akon
When Love Takes Over by David Guetta feat. Kelly Rowland
Single Ladies (Put a Ring on It) by Beyoncé
Use Somebody by Kings of Leon
I Gotta Feeling by The Black Eyed Peas
Poker Face by Lady Gaga

Best Classical Artist
Presented by Robin Gibb
Paul Potts
The Priests
Andrea Bocelli
Katherine Jenkins

World's Best Album
Presented by Rachel Hunter and Peter Andre
Number Ones by Michael Jackson
I Dreamed a Dream by Susan Boyle
The Fame by Lady Gaga
The E.N.D. by The Black Eyed Peas
Fearless by Taylor Swift
Louder- Charice

Rock Legends
Presented by Wladimir Klitschko
Scorpions

Award presentations not broadcast on television

World's Best Rock Artist
U2

More regional awards
World's Best Selling American Artist: Lady Gaga
World's Best Selling Australian Artist: Empire of the Sun
World's Best Selling British Artist: Susan Boyle
World's Best Selling Canadian Artist: Celine Dion
World's Best Selling German Artist: Rammstein
World's Best Selling Irish Artist: U2
World's Best Selling Italian Artist: Tiziano Ferro
World's Best Selling Latin American Artist: Shakira
World's Best Selling Middle Eastern Artist: Elissa
World's Best Selling Scandinavian Artist: A-Ha
World's Best Selling Spanish Artist: Mónica Naranjo

International telecasts
: Citytv
: NRJ 12
: Rai Due
Latin America: MGM Channel
: GMA 7
: MGM Channel
: Acasa TV
: SRF zwei
: Channel 4
: MyNetworkTV

Notes

External links
World Music Awards – Official Web Page

World Music Awards, 2010
Lists of World Music Award winners